Lesbian, gay, bisexual, and transgender (LGBT) people living in Nauru face legal and social challenges not experienced by non-LGBT persons. Same-sex sexual activity has been legal since May 2016, but there are no legal recognition of same-sex unions, or protections against discrimination in the workplace or the provision of goods and services.

The Human Truth Foundation has listed Nauru at rank 87 for LGBT rights. This was similar to other Pacific nations, such as Palau (86), the Marshall Islands (88) and Micronesia (90).

In 2011, Nauru signed the "joint statement on ending acts of violence and related human rights violations based on sexual orientation and gender identity" at the United Nations, condemning violence and discrimination against LGBT people.

Legality of same-sex sexual activity

Same-sex sexual activity was criminalised in 1921 when the island adopted the Criminal Code of Queensland (Criminal Code Act 1899), which was retained following Nauruan independence in 1968.

In January 2011, Mathew Batsiua, Minister for Health, Justice and Sports, stated that the decriminalisation of "homosexual activity between consenting adults" was "under active consideration". In October 2011, the Nauruan Government pledged to decriminalise same-sex sexual acts.

According to the United States Department of State, there were no reports in 2012 of prosecutions directed at LGBT persons.

In May 2016, the Parliament of Nauru passed the Crimes Act 2016 which repealed the Criminal Code 1899 and therefore legalised same-sex sexual activity.

Discrimination protections
Nauruan law does not address discrimination on account of sexual orientation or gender identity in employment or the provision of goods and services.

The Leadership Code Act 2016, which was passed in June 2016, states that a "leader" must not "discriminate between persons participating in or seeking to participate in Government on account of their age, race, ethnicity, gender, disability, sexual orientation, religious beliefs, place of origin or political beliefs or opinions". The term "leader" includes the office of president, speaker and deputy speaker of parliament, cabinet minister, member of parliament, judicial officers, ambassadors, electoral commissioners, commissioner of police, chief justice, etc.

The Mentally-disordered Persons (Amendment) Act 2016 states that a "person is not [to] be regarded as mentally disordered by reasons only that: [...] the person expresses or exhibits or refuses or fails to express, or has expressed or has refused or failed to express, a particular sexual preference or sexual orientation".

Summary table

See also

Human rights in Nauru
LGBT history in Nauru
LGBT rights in Oceania

References

External links

LGBT in Nauru
Nauru
Politics of Nauru
Law of Nauru